Utah's Dixie is the nickname for the populated, lower-elevation area of south-central Washington County in the southwestern portion of the U.S. state of Utah. Its winter climate is very mild when compared to the rest of Utah, and typical of the Mojave Desert, in which it lies.

Situated south of the Black Ridge and west of the Hurricane Cliffs, at the northeastern edge of the Mojave Desert, it was originally settled by Southern Paiutes. Following the Mexican–American War, it became part of the United States and was inhabited by members of the Church of Jesus Christ of Latter-day Saints in 1854 as part of Brigham Young's efforts to establish an Indian mission in the region.  During the later 1850s, the settlers began growing cotton and other temperate cash crops in the area of Santa Clara, Utah. The Paiute population was largely displaced and also declined due to diseases brought by the new settlers.

The Cotton Mission 
The area was first referred to as the "Cotton Mission", in response to Brigham Young's 14th General Epistle issued in October 1856. In spite of his determination that the Great Basin would be self-sufficient, it was not. He criticized the Saints as "quite negligent in raising cotton and flax". His command was emphatic: "And let our brethren who have the means, bring on cotton and woolen machinery, that we may be enabled to manufacture our own goods, so fast as we shall be able to supply ourselves with the raw material...."

Origin 
"[The] first groups of settlers [arriving in Spring 1857] – the Adair and Covington Companies – were people from the Southern States, mainly from Mississippi, Alabama, Virginia, Texas, and Tennessee." While there is no indication that slavery was practiced in Utah's cotton farming, Robert Dockery Covington, the leader of the second company of saints, was formerly a slave overseer and owner of eight slaves in the 1840 Census,  which made "farming a very profitable occupation". It is unknown whether Covington personally had experience growing cotton, or if his experience was limited to the enslavement of other humans who grew cotton.  A contemporary said: "He was a strong Rebel sympathizer and rejoiced whenever he heard of a Southern victory." Covington was the first President of the Washington Branch of the LDS Church. Covington's first counselor was Alexander Washington Collins, who the contemporary says was a former slave driver, who boastfully, with humor, and in public, told horrific stories of whippings and rapes of his slaves.

Andrew Larson's landmark history of the area states that in 1857, the area was already taking on the "Dixie" nickname:

Early challenges 
"[T]he harsh environment, the intense heat of summer, the continual toil, and the ravages of malaria . . . led some of the settlers to desert the place at the end of the first season." In the fall of 1858, it was reported "that of approximately 400 acres planted to cotton only 130 acres could be counted a success". Cultivation of cotton and food crops depended on irrigation, which was a collective activity. There were regular food shortages, including "the 'starving time' when many people were reduced to eating pigweed, alfalfa, and carrot top greens in lieu of a more substantial diet". But the sense of humor was not absent. George A. Hicks wrote a twelve stanza song which was a lament as well as wry comedy:
I feel so weak and hungry now, I think I'm nearly dead.
"Tis seven weeks next Sunday since I have tasted bread.
Of carrot tops and lucern greens we have enough to eat --
But I'd like to change that diet off for buckwheat cakes and meat.  
Charles L. Walker, a Latter-day Saint hymnist, wrote a song titled "St. George and the Drag-on" with a  chorus first line meant to inspire singing along: "Mesquite, soap root, prickly-pears and briars." This verse is the last:
The sun is it so scorching hot,
It makes the water siz, Sir.
The reason why it is so hot,
Is just because it is, Sir.
The wind like fury here does blow,
That when we plant or sow, Sir, 
We place one foot upon the seed, 
And hold it till it grows, Sir.  
The culture in the time, on a foundation of a shared religion, shared suffering and success, and even a collective economy for a time. A Mormon Pioneer in a neighboring area gave this expression:
   
This was a challenging task, in significant isolation, in the deserts of southern Utah. This collective bond is a foundation of what is often called the "Spirit of Dixie".

End of the Cotton Mission 
The Cotton Mission did not work out as well as Young had hoped. Yields in the test fields were not as high as expected, and economic viability of growing cotton was never achieved, although a cotton mill was built and used for a few years in the town of Washington. "[C]onsistent operation of the Factory" ended in 1897.

The name "Dixie" 
  The name "Dixie" was used by residents and others in the state as a shorthand reference to the area. The former St. George Stake Academy officially became Dixie State College in 1915. About that time, "Dixie" was painted on a red rock on the hill above St. George commonly called the Sugarloaf. Previously, the hill had been painted with the year of the graduating class and a "D". The "Dixie Rock" on the hill served to mark the name. In this time period, the nation was in a wave of nostalgic revisionism (including the mythology of the Lost Cause of the Confederacy) that made Dixie and the South an idealization of moonlight and magnolias "by the many attentions of northern artists to southern mythology, the North's fascination with aristocracy and lost causes, the national appeal of the agrarian myth, and the South's personification of that ideal, to say nothing of the North's persistent use of the South in the manipulation of her own racial mythology."

Now dozens of institutions and businesses in the area use the name "Dixie".

Devotion to the "Dixie" name 

Strong ties to the "Dixie" name are felt by some descendants of the pioneers. Those with long-standing ties to the area, and those who are newer, speak with deep affection of the land as giving you "red sand in your shoes" – something they feel is unique to that part of Utah. A well-known song (adapted from a popular Southern song published in 1915) sung by college students, school children, and former Mayor Daniel D. McArthur, is "Are You From Dixie?"
 Are you from Dixie?
I said from Dixie!
Where the fields of cotton beckon to me.
We're glad to see ya
To say 'How be ya?'
And the friends we're longin' to see.
If you're from Santa Clara, Washington
Or St. George, fine,
Anywhere below the Iron County line,
Then you're from Dixie,
Hurray for Dixie,
'Cause I'm from Dixie, too!"  

To some in the area, "Dixie" in the historical sense refers to the growing of cotton – a failing enterprise that exhausted their ancestors. Cotton was an expression of faith and solidarity; a commitment to a common cause. And after cotton, "Dixie" came to mean home. From the end of cotton before 1900 to 1950 meant the unique low-lying desert surrounded by high red cliffs and black lava bluffs, bisected by the Virgin River that gave life to people, livestock, fields, and pastures. Utah's Dixie was so distant from the Wasatch Front, where most of Utah's population lives, and from the state capital in Salt Lake City that it was a separate existence. Utah's Dixie had no geographic ties with most of Arizona, only that near-wilderness of the Arizona Strip, north of the Grand Canyon. And while the Virgin Valley area of Nevada had close relations, the historically religious residents of Southwestern Utah did not feel connected to Las Vegas.

The area was not connected to much, physically or culturally. Roads were rough and rugged until the 1950s and Interstate 15 was only completed in 1973. Air service from St. George began in the late 1950s. Television service came about the same time.

The community was small. St. George only had 5,130 inhabitants in 1960 and 11,350 in 1980. It did not wield much political influence, but it was advanced by exemplary state legislators from the area, such as Orval Hafen.

20th century links to the Confederacy at Dixie State College 
Links between southern Utah's Dixie and the Confederacy re-emerged in 1952, when "Dixie Junior College sports teams adopted 'Rebel' as their nickname and the school made its mascot a Confederate soldier in 1956. By 1960, the Confederate flag was flown as a school symbol." This was about the time the University of Nevada Las Vegas (UNLV) adopted its "Rebel" name and mascot, "a cartoon wolf with a Confederate uniform". This was also in a time when civil rights issues were emerging, between President Truman's integration of the Armed Services in 1948 and Brown v. Board of Education in 1954. On a "parade float called 'Gone With the Plow', dating from the late 1960s, a man with his skin painted black pushe[d] a plow while a white student, formally dressed with a top hat, [held] what appear to be reins or a whip".

John Jones and Dannelle Larsen-Rife wrote on behalf of the Southern Utah Anti-Discrimination Coalition, listing many Confederacy-related activities at the College: "black-face minstrel shows (through October 2012), mock slave auctions (through the early 1990s), Confederate flags (continuing to the present), and numerous other associations to the Confederacy prevalent on this campus (The "Rebel" mascot as recently as 2008, True Rebel Night is ongoing; The Dixie Confederate Yearbook into the 1990s)."

The Salt Lake Tribune recounted photos in Dixie College yearbooks, called The Confederate. "[A]s late as the early 1990s [w]hite students sing in black face, dress as Confederate soldiers, stage slave auctions and affectionately display the Confederate battle standard." The local newspaper The Spectrum reviewed and published excerpts from local newspapers and Dixie College publications that contain Confederate related activities, photographs, and references.

In March 1987 and 1988 the community held a festival called a Secession, presided over in 1987 by Governor Norman Bangerter and in 1988 by Wilford Brimley. Events included a ball in grand Southern style, presided over by costumed Rhett Butler and Scarlett O'Hara, who also participated in many publicity photos. A 40-foot Confederate flag hung over St. George Boulevard. Confederate flags were abundantly displayed by city, county and school officials in promotional photographs, and the Washington County News masthead had the Confederate flag and cited its location as "St. George, Confederate State of Dixie".

"Dixie" controversy 
Controversy over the use of the name "Dixie" has repeatedly arisen in the Southern Utah community at large.

Dixie State University

The Confederate flag was removed as a Dixie College symbol in 1993. In 2005 the Confederate soldier 'Rodney the Rebel' was eliminated as the mascot, and use of the nickname 'Rebels' was discontinued in 2007.

In 2007, as then named Dixie State College was considering affiliation with the University of Utah "U. officials said dropping the 'baggage' of Dixie would be mandatory."  "'Dixie' has connotations of the Old South, the Confederacy, and racism,’ Randy Dryer, then the U. trustees' chairman, wrote to The Chronicle of Higher Education." The affiliation with the University of Utah did not happen.

In 2012, many articles appeared as the school was about to make "the leap to university status next year". The Salt Lake Tribune editorialized that the school needed a new name based on the pioneer origin of the name, and Confederacy-honoring practices of the students. An African American student told the Tribune he was shocked to find old yearbooks with photos "of students in blackface, holding mock slave auctions, dressed in Confederate uniforms and staging parade floats and skits that seem to ridicule blacks, such as a crowd in black face behind a white student dressed as a Col. Sanders-type figure. 'In 1968 they were still doing minstrel shows,'" he said. The college student body president said in 2012 that when "on recruiting trips to California that he encountered students unwilling to consider studying at a place called Dixie. "One said, 'Your name makes me shudder,' and walked away ..." Faculty members who raised the issue complained about being asked to leave the community.

In 2015, following the Charleston, South Carolina, shootings by Dylann Roof, Dannelle Larsen-Rife again editorialized for renaming Dixie State University. She was interviewed on an episode of RadioWest (KUER) with professors from the University of Utah and University of Wyoming. A substantial statue of rebel soldiers and a horse, with a Confederate flag displayed, was returned to its sculptor.

In 2020, in the wake of the murder of George Floyd and the subsequent protests, the issue again returned. Jamie Belnap, a former resident of St. George, wrote "Now, seven years after the vote at DSU [to retain the Dixie name], murmurings about the name 'Dixie' have begun again. There's a new petition and, unsurprisingly, online detractors from the community have already begun to emerge.... Isn't it time DSU sends a message to its students of color that it cares more about equality than nostalgia?" On December 14, the University's board of trustees voted to recommend removing the word Dixie from the school's name. The 2021 Utah Legislature voted to take the recommendation, starting a year long process to solicit input and consider alternative names. The Board of Trustees of DSU and the Utah Board of Education both voted unanimously voted to move forward with "Utah Tech University". Earlier than expected, after in November 2021, the Utah State Legislature was called into a special session by Governor Spencer Cox. While the primary purpose for that session was to approve redistricting maps, The name change bill for Dixie State was included on topics to be discussed. While the issue continued to be contentious, the decision to bring the issue early in special session was made because leaders felt no more information was needed, only a vote and decision. Both bodies of the legislature voted on November 10, 2021 to change the name of the university to Utah Tech University effective July 2022.

Dixie Convention Center
In 2020, controversy affected the Dixie Convention Center. After a rebranding study, the governing board voted to change the Dixie Center name to Greater Zion Convention Center, consistent with the area's Greater Zion Convention and Tourism Office, which had a name change in 2019. "The vote to change [the Convention Center name] to Greater Zion on June 23 led to a flood of social media posts and an online petition that gathered over 17,000 signatures in favor of keeping Dixie as the name."
 "[A]fter a public comment period in which multiple community members expressed strong support of the Dixie name, the Interlocal Agency amended the motion to temporarily revert to the Dixie Center name and to meet again on the issue in six months."

In the community
A substantial number of citizens gathered at the St. George City offices July 2, 2020 to advocate for retaining the "Dixie" names.
Joey Sammons Ashby, who organized the event as part of the Protect Dixie effort, said "People in St. George are not racist.... We were never racist — never...." "You're not going to get rid of racism, but, instead of complaining, think about the blessings black people have." "Because of their ancestors, they're able to be an American, they were able to be born here, they're able to do something for themselves because this is America. This is America, and they can pull up their bootstraps and do it if they want to. There's plenty of people to help the blacks right now so instead of complaining, do something."  "We used to have minstrel shows here in St. George. It was in fun, it was nothing racist." "I used to dress up with a blackface for Halloween. I think actually it was a compliment to want to look like a blackface."

Dixie Regional Medical Center
On July 16, 2020, Intermountain Health Care announced the name of the former Dixie Regional Medical Center would change to Intermountain St. George Regional Hospital effective January 1, 2021. Mitch Cloward, hospital administrator, said "The meaning of Dixie is not clear for everyone. For some, it only requires explanation; for others, who are not from this area, it has offensive connotations.... Our hospital name should be strong, clear and make everyone we serve feel safe and welcome."

Today 
The largest community in the region, St. George, was founded in 1861, when Brigham Young selected 300 families to take over that area and grow cotton, grapes, and other crops. Other communities in Washington County include Ivins, Santa Clara, Hurricane, LaVerkin, and Toquerville. The population is nearly 180,000 in the metropolitan area.

While the term is almost exclusively used for Washington County, it sometimes is extended to nearby Kane and Iron counties, or even a broader southern Utah, evidenced by the term Payson-Dixon line, implying that everything south of Payson and the Wasatch Front generally is "Dixie."

References

Further reading

 

Regions of Utah
Geography of Washington County, Utah
Mojave Desert
1854 establishments in Utah Territory